Howard Scott is the founder of Technocracy Incorporated and the Technical Alliance.

Howard Scott may also refer to:

Howard E. Scott (born 1946), musician, founding member of the band War
Howard H. Scott (died 2012), sound engineer and producer
Howard Scott (translator), see 1997 and 2009 Governor General's Awards
Howie Scott, a character in the TV series City Lights

See also

Scott Howard (disambiguation)